Flaó (plural flaons) is a cheesecake or tart found in Spanish cuisine popular from Catalan speaking areas. It is claimed by Majorca, Ibiza and Formentera, with some controversy. Traditionally flaons were part of Easter family celebrations in Menorca, but now they are available all year round.

In some regions flaons are a type of crescent-shaped pie filled with jam and honey in Calasseit, Taragon, or some type of cheese, varying according to the location. Honey was used traditionally, but in modern times sweet flaons are usually sweetened with sugar. Historically, the first recorded mention of these cakes is from 1252 and they are mentioned as well in Ramon Llull's book Blanquerna, written in 1283.

Variants

Alt Maestrat
In the Alt Maestrat and Ports areas the cake has a semicircular shape and it is filled with a mixture of local cottage cheese (brull) and ground almonds flavored with aiguardent and mistela. The flaons of Morella are the gastronomic icon of the ancient city. An average-sized Morella flaó is about 12 cm long.

Ibiza and Formentera
The flaó d'Eivissa has a circular shape and has a filling of sheep or goat cottage cheese, eggs and sugar, slightly aromatized with peppermint leaves and aniseed. Flaons are usually eaten along with a glass of sweet wine or the local Liqueur frígola, a thyme-based digestive beverage.

Menorca
The flaó de Menorca is a pastry made with tender Maó cheese, wheat flour, olive oil and yeast. Often they include egg and a little lard in the recipe. Good Menorca flaons have to be very puffy in the middle. There are salty and sweet versions of this pastry in Menorca. Some of them have a filling, while in others all the ingredients are mixed together.

Matarranya
The flaonets de Calaceit ( = little flaons) are made in Calaceit, a town of La Franja region of Aragon. They are a different kind of pastry despite their name, for instead of cheese these small pastries have a filling based on pumpkin jam and honey.
These flaonets were one of the traditional Spanish pastries fondly remembered by painter Salvador Dalí.

Gallery

See also
 Flaouna

References

External links
 Gastronomia de Morella
 Balearic Recipes
 Els Flaons - Avui
 My Family's Flaounes

Cuisine of Ibiza
Mediterranean cuisine
Ports (comarca)
Spanish pastries
Cheesecakes
Stuffed desserts
Pies